French Africa includes all the historic holdings of France on the African continent.

Françafrique

French North Africa
  Egypt  (1798-1801)
 French Algeria (1830–1962)
 Protectorate of Tunisia (1881–1956)
 Protectorate in Morocco (1912–1956) 
 Military Territory of Fezzan-Ghadames (1943–1951)

French West Africa

 Ivory Coast (1843–1960)
 Dahomey or French Dahomey (now Benin) (1883–1960)
 Independent of Dahomey, under French protectorate in 1889
 Porto-Novo (protectorate) (1863–1865, 1882)
 Cotonou (protectorate) (1868)
 French Sudan (now Mali) (1883–1960)
 Senegambia and Niger (1902–1904)
 Guinea or French Guinea (1891–1958)
 Mauritania (1902–1960)
Adrar emirate (protectorate) (1909)
 The Taganit confederation's emirate (protectorate) (1905)
 Brakna confederation's emirate (protectorate)
 Emirate of Trarza (protectorate) (1902)
 Niger (1890–1960)
 Sultanate of Damagaram (Zinder) (protectorate) (1899)
 Senegal (1677–1960)
 French Upper Volta (now Burkina Faso) (1896–1960)
 French Togoland (1918–1960) (formerly a German colony, mandate became a French colony) (now Togo)
 Nigeria
 The Enclaves of Forcados and Badjibo (territory under a lease of 30 years) (1900–1927)
 The Emirate of Muri (Northeast of Nigeria) (1892–1893)
 Gambia
 Albreda (1681–1857)
 Kunta Kinteh Island (1695–1697, 1702)

French Equatorial Africa

 Chad (1900–1960)
 Oubangui-Chari (currently Central African Republic) (1905–1960)
 Dar al Kuti (protectorate) (1897) (in 1912 its sultanate was suppressed by the French)
 Sultanate of Bangassou (protectorate) (1894)
 Present-day The Republic of Congo, then French Congo (1875–1960)
 Gabon (1839–1960)
 French Cameroon (91% of current Cameroon) (1918–1960) (formerly a German colony, Mandate, Protectorate then French Colony)
 São Tomé and Príncipe (1709)

East Africa and Indian Ocean

 Madagascar (1896–1960)
 Kingdom of Imerina (protectorate) (1896)
 Isle de France (1715–1810) (now Mauritius)
 Djibouti (French Somaliland) (the French Territory of the Afars and the Issas) (French Somalia) (1862–1977)
 French Egypt (1798–1801, 1858–1882, 1956)
 Mayotte (1841–present)
 Seychelles (1756–1810)
 Chagos Archipelago (1721–1745, 1768–1814)
 The Scattered Islands (Banc du Geyser, Bassas da India, Europa Island, Juan de Nova Island, Glorioso Islands, Tromelin Island)
 Comoros (1866–1975)
 Réunion (1710–present)

See also
 French colonial empire
 History of Africa
 Overseas France
 Scramble for Africa
 Troupes coloniales – French colonial forces

References

Further reading
 Langley, Michael. "Bizerta to the Bight: The French in Africa."  History Today. (Oct 1972), pp 733–739. covers 1798 to 1900.
 Hutton, Patrick H. ed. Historical Dictionary of the Third French Republic, 1870–1940 (2 vol 1986)
 Northcutt, Wayne, ed. Historical Dictionary of the French Fourth and Fifth Republics, 1946– 1991 (1992)
 Singh, Gurjit. "France in Africa: Trying a youthful look, Gateway House, 21 October 2021" online; Available at SSRN

Policies and colonies
 Aldrich, Robert. Greater France: A History of French Overseas Expansion (1996)
 Baumgart, Winfried. Imperialism: The Idea and Reality of British and French Colonial Expansion, 1880–1914 (1982)
 Betts, Raymond. Tricouleur: The French Overseas Empire (1978), 174pp
 Betts, Raymond. Assimilation and Association in French Colonial Theory, 1890–1914 (2005) excerpt and text search
 
 Clayton, Anthony. The Wars of French Decolonization (1995)
 Cogneau, Denis, et al. "Taxation in Africa from Colonial Times to Present Evidence from former French colonies 1900-2018." (2021): online
 Conklin, Alice L. A Mission to Civilize: The Republican Idea of Empire in France and West Africa, 1895–1930 (1997) online
 Evans, Martin. "From colonialism to post-colonialism: the French empire since Napoleon." in Martin S. Alexander, ed., French History since Napoleon (1999) pp: 391–415.
 Gamble, Harry. Contesting French West Africa: Battles over Schools and the Colonial Order, 1900–1950 (U of Nebraska Press, 2017).  378 pp. online review
 Jennings, Eric T. Imperial Heights: Dalat and the Making and Undoing of French Indochina (2010).
 Lawrence, Adria. Imperial rule and the politics of nationalism: anti-colonial protest in the French empire (Cambridge UP, 2013).
 .
 Klein, Martin A. Slavery and colonial rule in French West Africa (Cambridge University Press, 1998)
 Manning, Patrick. Francophone Sub-Saharan Africa 1880-1995 (Cambridge UP, 1998). 
 Neres, Philip. French-speaking West Africa: From Colonial Status to Independence (1962) 
 Priestley, Herbert Ingram. France overseas: a study of modern imperialism (1938) 464pp.
 Quinn, Frederick. The French Overseas Empire (2000) 
 .
 Poddar, Prem, and Lars Jensen, eds., A historical companion to postcolonial literatures: Continental Europe and Its Empires (Edinburgh UP, 2008), excerpt also entire text online
 
 Priestley, Herbert Ingram. (1938) France overseas;: A study of modern imperialism 463pp; encyclopedic coverage as of late 1930s
 Roberts, Stephen H. History of French Colonial Policy (1870-1925) (2 vol 1929) vol 1 online also vol 2 online; Comprehensive scholarly history
 .
 Strother, Christian. "Waging War on Mosquitoes: Scientific Research and the Formation of Mosquito Brigades in French West Africa, 1899–1920." Journal of the history of medicine and allied sciences (2016): jrw005.
 Thomas, Martin. The French Empire Between the Wars: Imperialism, Politics and Society (2007) covers 1919–1939
 Thompson, Virginia, and Richard Adloff. French West Africa (Stanford UP, 1958).
 Wesseling, H.L. and Arnold J. Pomerans. Divide and rule: The partition of Africa, 1880–1914 (Praeger, 1996.)
 Wesseling, H.L. The European Colonial Empires: 1815–1919 (Routledge, 2015).

Decolonization
 Betts, Raymond F. Decolonization (2nd ed. 2004)
 Betts, Raymond F. France and Decolonisation, 1900–1960 (1991)
 Chafer, Tony. The end of empire in French West Africa: France's successful decolonization (Bloomsbury Publishing, 2002).
 Chamberlain, Muriel E. ed. Longman Companion to European Decolonisation in the Twentieth Century (Routledge, 2014)
 Clayton, Anthony. The wars of French decolonization (Routledge, 2014).
 Cooper, Frederick. "French Africa, 1947–48: Reform, Violence, and Uncertainty in a Colonial Situation." Critical Inquiry  (2014) 40#4 pp: 466–478. in JSTOR
 Ikeda, Ryo. The Imperialism of French Decolonisation: French Policy and the Anglo-American Response in Tunisia and Morocco (Palgrave Macmillan, 2015)
 Jansen, Jan C. & Jürgen Osterhammel. Decolonization: A Short History (Princeton UP, 2017). online
 Jones, Max, et al. "Decolonising imperial heroes: Britain and France." Journal of Imperial and Commonwealth History 42#5 (2014): 787–825.
 Lawrence, Adria K. Imperial Rule and the Politics of Nationalism:  Anti-Colonial Protest in the French Empire (Cambridge UP, 2013) online reviews
 McDougall, James. "The Impossible Republic: The Reconquest of Algeria and the Decolonization of France, 1945–1962," The Journal of Modern History 89#4 (December 2017) pp 772–811 excerpt
 Rothermund, Dietmar. Memories of Post-Imperial Nations: The Aftermath of Decolonization, 1945–2013 (2015) excerpt; Compares the impact on Great Britain, the Netherlands, Belgium, France, Portugal, Italy and Japan
 Rothermund, Dietmar. The Routledge companion to decolonization (Routledge, 2006), comprehensive global coverage; 365pp
 Shepard, Todd. The Invention of Decolonization: The Algerian War and the Remaking of France (2006)
 Simpson, Alfred William Brian. Human Rights and the End of Empire: Britain and the Genesis of the European Convention (Oxford University Press, 2004).
 Smith, Tony. "A comparative study of French and British decolonization." Comparative Studies in Society and History (1978) 20#1 pp: 70–102. online 
 Smith, Tony. "The French Colonial Consensus and People's War, 1946–58." Journal of Contemporary History (1974): 217–247. in JSTOR
 Thomas, Martin, Bob Moore, and Lawrence J. Butler. Crises of Empire: Decolonization and Europe's imperial states (Bloomsbury Publishing, 2015)
 Von Albertini, Rudolf. Decolonization: the Administration and Future of the Colonies, 1919–1960 (Doubleday, 1971), scholarly analysis of French policies, pp 265–469..

Images and impact on France
 Andrew, Christopher M., and Alexander Sydney Kanya-Forstner. "France, Africa, and the First World War." Journal of African History 19.1 (1978): 11–23.
 . online
 Andrew, C. M., and A. S. Kanya-Forstner. "The French 'Colonial Party': Its Composition, Aims and Influence, 1885-1914." Historical Journal 14#1 (1971): 99–128. online.
 August, Thomas G. The Selling of the Empire: British and French Imperialist Propaganda, 1890–1940 (1985)
 Chafer, Tony, and Amanda Sackur. Promoting the Colonial Idea: Propaganda and Visions of Empire in France (2002) 
 .
 Conkin, Alice L. A Mission to Civilize: The Republican Idea of Empire in France and West Africa, 1895-1930 (1997) online 
 Dobie, Madeleine. Trading Places: Colonization & Slavery in 18th-Century French Culture (2010)
 .
 Rosenblum, Mort. Mission to Civilize: The French Way (1986) online review
 Rothermund, Dietmar. Memories of Post-Imperial Nations: The Aftermath of Decolonization, 1945–2013 (2015) excerpt; Compares the impact on Great Britain, the Netherlands, Belgium, France, Portugal, Italy and Japan
 Singer, Barnett, and John Langdon. Cultured Force: Makers and Defenders of the French Colonial Empire (2008)
 Thomas, Martin, ed. The French Colonial Mind, Volume 1: Mental Maps of Empire and Colonial Encounters (France Overseas: Studies in Empire and D) (2012); The French Colonial Mind, Volume 2: Violence, Military Encounters, and Colonialism (2012)

Historiography and memoir
 Bennington, Alice. "Writing Empire? The Reception of Post-Colonial Studies in France." Historical Journal (2016) 59#4: 1157–1186. abstract
 .
 Lawrence, Adria K. Imperial Rule and the Politics of Nationalism: Anti-Colonial Protest in the French Empire (Cambridge UP, 2013) online reviews

History of Africa
Former French colonies
French colonial empire
French colonisation in Africa
List
French possessions
possessions and colonies
possessions and colonies